Mihail Etropolski (born April 20, 1984) is a nationally ranked American sabre fencer.

References

American male sabre fencers
Living people
1984 births
Place of birth missing (living people)
21st-century American people